Out of Bounds is the sixth album by Finnish a cappella ensemble Rajaton, released in 2006. Like their 2001 album Boundless, this album is almost entirely in English and was originally intended to be export only in order to reach out to foreign listeners. The CD contains two re-releases, four new versions of previously recorded songs (including a collaboration with The Real Group), English versions of three Kevät songs and three new tracks.

Track listing
Title (Composer / Lyricist)
 Dobbin's Flowery Vale (2006 Version) (Irish folk melody, arr. Matti Kallio)
 Un-Wishing Well (2006 version) (Heikki Sarmanto / Kim Rich / arr. Jussi Chydenius)
 Butterfly (Mia Makaroff)
 We Walk in a Fog (2006 version, featuring The Real Group) (Jussi Chydenius / Eino Leino, English translation by Jaakko Mäntyjärvi)
 Vanishing Act (Soila Sariola / Stephen Hatfield / arr. Soila Sariola, Jyri Sariola, and Leri Leskinen)
 The Wild Song (Michael McGlynn)
 I Was Brought to My Senses (Sting, arr. Hannu Lepola)
 Lady Madonna (John Lennon & Paul McCartney, arr. Jussi Chydenius)
 Salty Water (Markku Reinikainen / Stephen Hatfield / arr. Soila Sariola and Leri Leskinen)
 Snow (Teemu Brunila / Anders Edenroth / arr. Jussi Chydenius and Leri Leskinen)
 How Little (Mia Makaroff)
 Mitä kaikatat, kivonen? (2006 version) (Mia Makaroff / trad.)

Notes
The original versions of "Dobbin's Flowery Vale", and "Un-Wishing Well" appeared in Boundless.
"Butterfly" and "Lady Madonna" remain the same as in Boundless.
"We Walk in a Fog" was first released in Finnish in Nova, then in English in Boundless.
"Vanishing Act" and "Salty Water" are Finnish to English homophonic translations of the original tracks "Kivinen Tie" and "Venelaulu", based on their vowel sounds. "Snow" is a more direct translation of the original track "Lunta". All three originally appeared in Kevät.
"Mitä kaikatat, kivonen?" first appeared in Nova.

Reference list

External links
 Official Rajaton website
 Rajaton - Out of Bounds at Last.fm

Rajaton albums
2006 albums